The 1977 Polish Speedway season was the 1977 season of motorcycle speedway in Poland.

Individual

Polish Individual Speedway Championship
The 1977 Individual Speedway Polish Championship final was held on 22 July at Gorzów.

Golden Helmet
The 1977 Golden Golden Helmet organised by the Polish Motor Union (PZM) was the 1977 event for the league's leading riders.

Final classification (top 20)

Junior Championship
 winner - Marek Ziarnik

Silver Helmet
 winner - Andrzej Huszcza

Bronze Helmet
 winner - Mieczysław Kmieciak

Pairs

Polish Pairs Speedway Championship
The 1977 Polish Pairs Speedway Championship was the 1977 edition of the Polish Pairs Speedway Championship. The final was held on 18 August at Ostrów Wielkopolski.

Team

Team Speedway Polish Championship
The 1977 Team Speedway Polish Championship was the 1977 edition of the Team Polish Championship. 

Stal Gorzów Wielkopolski won the gold medal for the third successive year. The team included Edward Jancarz, Bogusław Nowak and Jerzy Rembas.

First League

Second League

References

Poland Individual
Poland Team
Speedway
1977 in Polish speedway